Antonie Delport Claassen (born 20 October 1984) is a French and South African rugby union player. His position is Flanker and he currently plays for Racing 92 in the Top 14. He began his career with Blue Bulls in his native South Africa before moving to CA Brive in 2006. His father, Wynand Claassen was a South African international and Springboks captain in 1981–82. Claassen made his debut for France in the 2013 Six Nations Championship, qualifying on residency grounds.

He graduated from Durban High School in 2002, and represented South Africa at U19 level.

Honours

Club 
 Castres
Top 14: 2012–13

 Racing 92
Top 14: 2015–16

References

1984 births
Living people
CA Brive players
Castres Olympique players
France international rugby union players
Racing 92 players
Rugby union flankers
Rugby union players from Durban
South African rugby union players